John Parker (21 October 1799 – 5 September 1881) was an English politician and barrister. He was born in Tickhill, West Riding of Yorkshire and educated at Repton and Brasenose College, Oxford. He was instrumental in the enfranchisement of Sheffield, petitioning Parliament in 1817 and 1822, and creating a pamphlet stating the case for Sheffield in 1830. When the Sheffield constituency was finally created as a Parliamentary borough in 1832 he was elected alongside James Silk Buckingham as its first MPs. He served as MP for Sheffield until 1852, becoming Lord of the Treasury (1839–1840), First Secretary of the Admiralty, joint Secretary to the Treasury (1846–1849), and a Member of the Privy council (1853).

He died at 71 Onslow Square, London, on 5 September 1881, and was buried at Healaugh, near Tadcaster, West Riding of Yorkshire, on 9 September, having married, on 8 February 1853, Eliza Charlotte, second daughter of George Vernon of Clontarf Castle, Dublin, Ireland.

References

External links 
 

1799 births
1881 deaths
People from Tickhill
People educated at Repton School
Alumni of Brasenose College, Oxford
Members of the Parliament of the United Kingdom for English constituencies
Members of the Privy Council of the United Kingdom
History of Sheffield
UK MPs 1832–1835
UK MPs 1835–1837
UK MPs 1837–1841
UK MPs 1841–1847
UK MPs 1847–1852